Lecciones y Ensayos is a biannual law review run by university students and published by the University of Buenos Aires School of Law since 1956.

History 
The journal was established in 1956 by Ignacio Winizky, director of the Publication Department of the University of Buenos Aires School of Law.

With the constitutional breakdown of 1976, the journal went through a period during which its publishing activity was not in charge of students. In 1983, with the return to democracy, the fundamental principles laid down by Ignacio Winizky were restored, and the journal was again run by the students of the School of Law.

Former prominent members 
Carlos Fayt
Manuel Garrido
Luis Jiménez de Asúa
Enrique Santiago Petracchi

References

External links 
 

General law journals
Publications established in 1956
Spanish-language journals
Law journals edited by students
Biannual journals